Call 911 may refer to:
 Call 911 (song)
 Call 911 (TV series)